Andrey Mikhailovich Khramov (born 17 January 1981 in Baskhortostan) is a Russian orienteering competitor. He is winner of the 2005  World Orienteering Championships, Long distance, and finished third in 2006, and second in 2007. He is a three-time relay World Champion, in 2006, 2007 and 2010 as a member of the Russian winning teams, and earned a silver medal in 2004. He won the World Orienteering Championships in the sprint distance in Olomouc in 2008 and defended his title in Miskolc in 2009.

References

External links 
 Personal website

1981 births
Living people
People from Bashkortostan
Russian orienteers
Male orienteers
Foot orienteers
World Orienteering Championships medalists
World Games gold medalists
World Games silver medalists
World Games bronze medalists
Competitors at the 2009 World Games
Competitors at the 2013 World Games
Competitors at the 2017 World Games
World Games medalists in orienteering
Sportspeople from Bashkortostan
21st-century Russian people
Junior World Orienteering Championships medalists